Heroes in the City of Dope is the first collaborative studio album by Zion I and The Grouch. It was released on Om Records on October 10, 2006. It peaked at number 29 on the Billboard Heatseekers Albums chart, as well as number 34 on the Independent Albums chart.

Critical reception

Kevin Jones of Exclaim! gave the album a favorable review, saying: "With no shortness of inspiration, Zion I and the Grouch ensure that not a minute of this record goes to waste, matching engaging auditory pleasure with words that actually amount to something." Marisa Brown of AllMusic called it "partially introspection, partially consciousness, and partially hyphy-inspired dance music." Eric K. Arnold of East Bay Express wrote: "This collaborative effort presented an alternate view of Bay Area rap, one more concerned with quality-of-life issues than grill-pieces and rims."

Track listing

Personnel
Credits adapted from liner notes.

 Zumbi (Zion I) – vocals
 Amp Live (Zion I) – production (except 3, 4, 10)
 The Grouch – vocals, production (10)
 Indela Mass – vocals (1, 11), guitar (1), electric piano (1)
 Mistah F.A.B. – vocals (2)
 John Lucasey – vocals (2)
 Geechi T. – trumpet (2)
 Martin Luther – vocals (3)
 Eligh – production (3)
 Headnodic – production (4), guitar (13), bass guitar (13, 15)
 Jennifer Epp – vocals (5)
 Madame Mangle – vocals (5)
 Chali 2na – vocals (6)
 Kevin Choice – keyboards (7)
 Esthero – vocals (8)
 Errol Cooney – guitar (8)
 Marguerite Ostro – violin (8)
 DJ Platurn – turntables (9)
 Jason Moss – guitar (11), mixing
 Jeremy Miller – guitar (11, 15)
 Brandon Jordan – vocals (11), guitar (11)
 C. Holiday – vocals (12)
 David Goodlett – guitar (12)
 Joe Cohen – saxophone (12)
 Adam Theis – trombone (12)
 Deuce Eclipse – vocals (13)
 Justin Weis – mastering
 Motivate Movement – layout, design
 Paul Beresniewicz – illustration
 Snap Jackson – photography

Charts

References

External links
 

2006 albums
Zion I albums
The Grouch (rapper) albums
Om Records albums
Albums produced by Eligh